Holmen is a station on the Røa Line (line 2) of the Oslo T-bane system. It is located between Makrellbekken and Hovseter and serves the neighbourhood of Holmen. The station is 6.1 km from Stortinget. Holmen was opened on 24 January 1935 when the line was completed to Røa. The station is at an altitude of 119.4 metres above sea level. The station is located in a mainly residential area.

The Oslo subway system has fought a battle against graffiti, and one of the incidents turned violent on 2 February 2007, when a subway driver was beaten by a vandal.

References

External links

Oslo Metro stations in Oslo
Railway stations opened in 1935
1935 establishments in Norway